The Tie That Binds is a 1995 thriller film directed by screenwriter Wesley Strick and starring Daryl Hannah, Keith Carradine, Vincent Spano, Moira Kelly and Julia Devin. Strick's directing debut, the film follows the struggles of a couple who have just adopted a 6-year-old girl, only to discover that her biological parents, a murderous couple, are trying to reclaim her.

Released in the United States on September 8, 1995, The Tie That Binds grossed over $5 million at the domestic box office. At the 17th annual Young Artist Awards in 1996, Julia Devin was nominated for Best Young Supporting Actress - Feature Film, but lost out to Kristy Young, who was in the movie Gordy.

Plot
In California, John Netherwood (Keith Carradine) and his wife Leann Netherwood (Daryl Hannah) are fugitives who are wanted for murder. They have a 6-year-old daughter named Janie (Julia Devin).

John and Leann are robbing a house when the elderly residents of the house show up. After killing the two residents, John and Leann go outside, where there are cops waiting. John and Leann escape after John gets shot by Officer David Carrey (Ned Vaughn). Janie is found in the car that John and Leann left behind, and Janie is placed up for adoption.

Helped by adoption agency case worker Maggie Hass (Jenny Gago), Los Angeles architect Russell Clifton (Vincent Spano) and his photographer wife Dana (Moira Kelly) adopt Janie, welcoming a traumatized Janie into their home. Though intelligent and charming, Janie's behavior is very disturbing: She hides in closets, cuts herself, steals food, and draws monstrous pictures of the "Tooth Fairy," of whom she's terrified. Russell and Dana believe that with love, Janie will be alright.

Meanwhile, the Netherwoods begin planning to reclaim Janie. Leann picks up Officer Carrey and John tortures the name of the adoption agency out of Carrey before John slits Carrey's throat, killing Carrey. The Netherwoods then force Maggie to tell them who adopted Janie and kill her as well. At the same time, Russell and Dana have found out who Janie's biological parents are. Leann attempts to kidnap Janie from school, forcing the Cliftons to go into hiding with Janie.

The Netherwoods track down the Cliftons' friends, Lisa Marie Chandler (Cynda Williams) and her husband Gil Chandler (Bruce A. Young). Leann threatens to hurt the Chandlers' newborn baby, forcing Lisa Marie to tell Leann where the Cliftons are hiding: a half-built house that Russell designed for himself, Dana, and Janie.

The Netherwoods head to the half-built house and take Janie and the Cliftons hostage. John sets the house on fire. Russell and John struggle with each other, then John starts running through the burning house looking for Janie, who has now run off into the nearby woods. Along the way, John runs into Leann in the blinding smoke. Leann has found Dana and Janie, and has had a change of heart. Because of that, John kills Leann by snapping her neck.

Dana runs into the woods to find Janie, and John is following Dana. John is the first to find Janie, and Janie pulls out a knife, stabs John in the stomach, and then says, "I learned that from you, daddy." Dana finds Janie just as an enraged John, realizing that Janie will never love him, attempts to kill them both until Russell shows up, carrying a log the size of a baseball bat and knocks John to the ground. As a weakened John attempts to get back up, Russell uses the log to smash his head, killing John. Janie finally feels comfortable about being with the Cliftons and accepts them as her family.

Cast
 Daryl Hannah as Leann Netherwood
 Keith Carradine as John Netherwood
 Vincent Spano as Russell Clifton 
 Moira Kelly as Dana Clifton
 Julia Devin as Janie  
 Bruce A. Young as Gil Chandler
 Cynda Williams as Lisa Marie Chandler
 Ray Reinhardt as Sam Bennett
 Barbara Tarbuck as Jean Bennett
 Carmen Argenziano as Phil Hawkes
 Jenny Gago as Maggie Hass
 Ned Vaughn as Officer David Carrey
 George Marshall Ruge as Detective Frank Mercer

Reception
The Tie That Binds was heavily panned by critics—particularly Leonard Maltin, who called it "...sleazy, insultingly derivative, and full of dangling plot issues." 
The film holds a rating of 8% on Rotten Tomatoes based on reviews from 12 critics.

References

External links
 
 

1995 films
1995 thriller films
American thriller films
Films about adoption
Films scored by Graeme Revell
Films set in California
Hollywood Pictures films
Interscope Communications films
PolyGram Filmed Entertainment films
1995 directorial debut films
1990s English-language films
1990s American films